Phlomis fruticosa, the Jerusalem sage, is a species of flowering plant in the family Lamiaceae, native to Albania, Cyprus, Greece, Italy, Turkey, and countries of the former Yugoslavia.

The sage-like, aromatic leaves are oval, 5–10 cm (2-4ins) long, wrinkled, grey-green with white undersides, and covered with fine hairs. Deep yellow, tubular flowers, 3 cm in length, grow in whorls of 20 in short spikes in summer.

The specific epithet fruticosa means "shrubby".

It is popular as an ornamental plant, and has gained the Royal Horticultural Society's Award of Garden Merit.

As a garden escape, it has naturalised in parts of South West England.

It is listed as deer resistant, hardy in zones 7 to 11, and tolerant of a range of soil types.

See also
 Phlomis russeliana – the similar-looking Turkish sage also sometimes called Jerusalem sage

References

 
 Michigan State University entry
 Craker, L. E. & J. E. Simon, eds.  1986–1987. Herbs, spices, and medicinal plants, 2 vols.
 Davis, P. H., ed. 1965–1988. Flora of Turkey and the east Aegean islands.
 Greuter, W. et al., eds. 1984–. Med-Checklist.
 Huxley, A., ed. 1992. The new Royal Horticultural Society dictionary of gardening.
 Komarov, V. L. et al., eds. 1934–1964. Flora SSSR.
 Tutin, T. G. et al., eds. 1964–1980. Flora europaea.

External links

fruticosa
Shrubs
Flora of Albania
Flora of Cyprus
Flora of Greece
Flora of Italy
Flora of Turkey
Plants described in 1753
Taxa named by Carl Linnaeus